Antônio Meneses Neto (born 23 August 1957 in Recife) is a Brazilian cellist.
Antonio Meneses was born into a family of musicians. His father was first horn player at the Opera of Rio de Janeiro. He began to study the cello when he was ten. During a tour in South America, the famous cellist Antonio Janigro met him and asked him to join his classes in Düsseldorf and then in Stuttgart.
In 1977, he won the first Prize at the International Competition in Munich and in 1982 he was awarded first Prize and gold Medal at the Tchaikowsky Competition in Moscow.

Orchestra performances
He regularly performs with orchestras such as the Berlin Philharmonic Orchestra (Riccardo Muti, Mariss Jansons), London Symphony Orchestra (Claudio Abbado, André Previn), BBC Symphony Orchestra (Andrew Davis), Amsterdam Royal Concertgebouw Orchestra (Semyon Bychkov, Herbert Blomstedt), Vienna Symphony Orchestra, in Warsaw, the Czech Philharmonic (Gerd Albrecht), the Moscow and the Saint Petersburg Philharmonic Orchestra (Yuri Temirkanov), the Israel Philharmonic, Orchestre de la Suisse Romande (Neeme Järvi), the Bayerische Rundfunk Orchestra, New York Philharmonic Orchestra (Kurt Sanderling), in Washington with the National Symphony Orchestra and Mstislav Rostropovitch, in Buenos Aires, with the NHK Symphony Orchestra in Tokyo.

Music festivals
He is also the guest at many important music festivals, including Puerto Rico (Festival Pablo Casals), Salzbourg, Lucerne, the Vienna Festwochen, the Berlin Festwochen, the Prague Spring Festival, New York (Mostly Mozart Festival), Seattle, la Grange de Meslay (the festival of Svjatoslav Richter in France) or the Festival de Colmar, the festival of Vladimir Spivakov in France, the Jerusalem Chamber Music Festival.

Concerts
He regularly gives chamber music concerts with the Vermer Quartet on tour in Europe and in Japan, the Amati Quartet or the Quartetto David. Antonio Meneses was the cellist of the Beaux Arts Trio from October 1998 until its end in 2008.

Recitals
In recital, Antonio Meneses is playing either with Nelson Freire or Gérard Wyss.
Antonio Meneses has made two records for D.G.G. with Herbert von Karajan and the Berlin Philharmonic Orchestra: Brahms' Double Concerto for violin and cello with Anne-Sophie Mutter (1983) and then Richard Strauss' "Don Quixote". Antonio Meneses has also recorded the D'Albert Concerto and works of David Popper both with the Basel Symphony Orchestra. He has also recorded the six suites of Bach for Nippon Phonogram and Tchaïkovsky' Trio for EMI/Angel. In July 1997 Antonio Meneses has recorded the three concertos by Carl Philipp Emanuel Bach with the Munich Chamber Orchestra (without conductor). He has recently recorded the concertos and the fantasy for cello and orchestra by Heitor Villa-Lobos.
Antonio Meneses also gives masterclasses in Europe, North America and in Japan.
March 2001

International Tchaikovsky Competition
He won the VI Tchaikovsky competition. Meneses combines an intense soloist concert career with chamber music performances. He is a teacher at Bern's Hochschule der Künste.

External links 
 Official Homepage of Antônio Meneses

References 

Brazilian classical cellists
1957 births
Living people
Beaux Arts Trio members